Kinbrace railway station is a railway station serving the village of Kinbrace in the Highland council area in the north of Scotland. It is located on the Far North Line,  from Inverness, between Kildonan and Forsinard. The station is managed by ScotRail, who operate the services at the station.

History 

The line opened on 28 July 1874 and included a station at Kinbrace.

Facilities 
The station unusually has two waiting shelters, as well as a help point and bike racks. As there are no facilities to purchase tickets, passengers must buy one in advance, or from the guard on the train.

Previously, passengers wishing to board a train at Scotscalder had to flag the train by raising their arm (as is still done at other request stops around the country); this meant that the driver needed to reduce the train's speed before a request stop (to look out for any potential passengers on the platform and be able to stop if necessary), even if the platform was empty. The new system consists of an automatic kiosk (with a button for passengers to press) at the platform; this will alert the driver about any waiting passengers in advance and, if there is no requirement to stop, the train can maintain line speed through the request stops, thus improving reliability on the whole line.

Platform layout 

The single platform is long enough for a four-coach train.

Passenger volume 

The statistics cover twelve month periods that start in April.

Services 
There is a fourth Wick to Inverness service, but this does not stop at Kinbrace. There is a single train each way on Sundays.

This station is designated as a request stop. This means that passengers intending to alight must inform the guard in advance, and any passengers wishing to board must press a "request" button located at the kiosk on the platform.

References

External links
RAILSCOT page on Kinbrace

Railway stations in Sutherland
Railway stations in Great Britain opened in 1874
Railway stations served by ScotRail
Former Highland Railway stations
Railway request stops in Great Britain
William Baxter railway stations